The Corn Exchange and market house in Bridgwater, Somerset, England was built in 1834 by John Bowen and extended in 1875, by Charles Knowles. It has been designated as a Grade I listed building.

The original market hall, which dates from 1791, is fronted by a circular portico with a domed roof with Tuscan pillars. The distinctive portico was added after the north and south sides of the corn market were demolished for road widening in 1825.

It was originally surrounded by railings to separate the livestock from the food produce. The railings were removed in 1895.

In front of the building is a statue of Robert Blake who was born in the town. The statue was made in 1898 by F. W. Pomeroy and has since been repositioned to face down Cornhill.

See also
 Corn exchange
 Corn exchanges in England
 Grade I listed buildings in Sedgemoor

References

Commercial buildings completed in 1834
Grade I listed buildings in Sedgemoor
Bridgwater